Kök-Tash is an urban-type settlement in Jalal-Abad Region of Kyrgyzstan. Administratively, it is part of the city Mayluu-Suu. Its population was 3,451 in 2021.

Population

References
 

Populated places in Jalal-Abad Region